Aşağı Seyfəli (also, Ashagy Seyfali, Ashagy-Shikhly, Seyfaly, and Seyfeli) is a village and municipality in the Shamkir Rayon of Azerbaijan.  It has a population of 6,202.

References 

Populated places in Shamkir District